Maqbanah District is a district of the Taiz Governorate, Yemen. As of 2003, the district has a population of 62,471 inhabitants. The district is divided into three Makhalief: Mikhlaf Shamir, Mikhlaf Mirab and Mikhlaf al-Tharibat.

References

 
Districts of Taiz Governorate